Joseph Lewis Oliver Bailey (born 22 February 1942 in Bermuda) is a former Bermudian cricketer. He was a left-handed batsman and a right-arm off-break bowler. He was the captain for Bermuda's inaugural first class match, against New Zealand in 1972. It was the maiden first-class match to be played by the Bermuda cricket team. He also represented Bermuda in the first two ICC Trophy tournaments.

References

External links
Cricket Archive profile
Cricinfo profile

1942 births
Bermudian cricketers
Living people
Bermuda cricket captains